Acalyptris limonii is a moth of the family Nepticulidae. It is found along the coasts of Adriatic, Ionian and Aegean Seas, where it has been recorded from Croatia and Greece.

The wingspan is 4.1-4.8 mm.

The larvae feed on Limonium vulgare. They mine the leaves of their host plant. The mine consists of a gallery, starting much contorted, often spirally, but later becoming a full-depth mine with narrow broken frass, running more-or-less straight through the leaf. The exit hole is located on the leaf upperside. The cocoon is white and usually spun on the underside of the leaf.

External links
Acalyptris Meyrick: revision of the platani and staticis groups in Europe and the Mediterranean (Lepidoptera: Nepticulidae)
bladmineerders.nl

Nepticulidae
Moths of Europe
Moths described in 1998